KSIL (107.1 FM) is a radio station licensed to serve Rincon, New Mexico. The station is owned by Debra Tolleson and Humberto Hernandez and licensed to Rincon Ventures, LLC. It airs a bilingual rhythmic CHR music format featuring an eclectic mix of music including Latin pop, Reggaeton.

The station was assigned the KSIL call letters by the Federal Communications Commission on January 7, 2007.

References

External links

SIL
Radio stations established in 2002
2002 establishments in New Mexico
Rhythmic contemporary radio stations in the United States
SIL